Herbert C Scaping (1866-1934)  was an architect who worked in Grimsby, Lincolnshire in the Arts and Crafts and Art Nouveau styles. He was born in Rathfarnham, co Dublin before his family moved to Hull, his only known family are his two daughters Rathlea and Rathgowry.   He trained with Smith and Broderick of Hull, setting up his own practice in Grimsby in 1890. He became the Lincoln Diocesan surveyor and  surveyor to Lord Heneage. Architect to the Grimsby Education Committee and Board of Guardians. His office was at Court Chambers in Grimsby.

Architectural Work

Public Buildings

Scartho, Grimsby Workhouse which became Grimsby Old Hospital. 1892. Ernest William Farebrother was the original architect, but after his death the work was continued by Herbert Scaping.  
Kilton Hill Infirmary, Worksop, Nottinghamshire. 1901-1904.  Workhouse Infirmary. Later part of Bassetlaw Hospital Trust. Central administrative block with Baroque revival entrance facade and two plain side wings. 

Grimsby Old Court House, Brighowgate. 1902. Edwardian with Art Nouveau  detail 
 
Cleethorpes Town Hall. 1904. Brick with stone dressings.  with a crisply detailed Baroque facade surmounted by a lantern tower. Top-lit staircase hall, the balustrade in a bold Arts and Crafts foliate design in cast iron 
Grimsby Former Education Offices, Eleanor Street. 1900. Brick with stone dressings in a Norman Shaw  Baroque manner. The upper floor enriched with bands of stone. Mansard food with rounded gable ends. 
Grimsby, Salvation Army Hostel, Brighowgate. 1913. Neo-Georgian.

Shops and Commercial Buildings

Grimsby. National Provincial Bank. Riby Road 1900. Stone faced Neo-Georgian with mansard roof and pedimented dormer window

Grimsby, Royal Insurance Building (now TSB), No. 43 Victoria Street West.1904 Red brick with buff terracotta dressings and marble plinth in Edwardian freestyle. On corner of Victoria Street with Brewery Street.Three  storeys with  four  bays on  Brewery Street frontage. At the corner a  round-arched entrance with keystone and side brackets supporting a carved corbelled base to an octagonal angle turret which rises through the second and third storeys. Brewery Street front has a rectangular first-floor oriel to centre left with a pilastered three part  window, forming the parapet to a second-floor balcony. Flanking this are windows  in similar Ionic pilastered and pedimented surrounds. All second-floor windows linked by sill string course and 3 flush bands which is very typical of Scaping’s work. Dentilled cornice. The corner  turret has an octagonal upper stage with  a string course carrying small Ionic pilasters, moulded cornice and dome with ball finial. Flanking bays have coped gables with central round-headed niches' Listed Grade II in June 1999. 

Grimsby Former Pestle and Mortar Public House, 5-6 Old Market Place  (1917) for Hadley's Brewery. Brick with composite stone facing to ground floor, imitation timber-framing and plaster infill to upper floors. Slate roof. Tudor Revival style, with ornate West Midlands-style timber framing.
Tudor Cafe/Chambers Bar, Lounge and Grill. Former Litten Tree, Grimsby. Half timbered twin gabled frontage.

Grimsby School of Art

Grimsby, Eleanor Street. Wintringham Grammar School (1894)  which became  Grimsby Municipal College  and later Technical school, art college and local education authority building, is now derelict. Herbert C Scaping designed the Grade II listed building, which displays his trademark cupola on the roof, and it was built by Grimsby builders Hewins and Goodhand. Now derelict.

Houses
Rathfarnham, Welholme Road. Grimsby. ?1902. House built by Scaping for himself.
Bargate, Grimsby. House for Sir Alec Black
Nos. 25 & @7, Rathlea (25) and Rathgowry (27), Weelsby Road, Grimsby with major changes made to 27 but fewer to 25. Semi-detached house.
Barnoldby le BeckHouse for Mr Osmond.

Housing Developments
Weelsby Road, Grimsby. 
Scartho. Waltham Road, Nos 74-100. Semi detached row of cottages named Flower cottages. 
Grimsby Nunsthorpe Estate and School. A post First World War housing estate with many of the houses designed by Scaping

Literature
Antram N (revised), Pevsner N & Harris J, (1989), The Buildings of England: Lincolnshire, Yale University Press.
Antonia Brodie (ed), Directory of British Architects, 1834–1914: 2 Vols,  British Architectural Library, Royal Institute of British Architects, 2001
Chapman P. Herbert Scaping 1866-1934. The man who made Grimsby. Lincolnshire Life vol 7, no 2 April 1968 pp 26-31

References

1866 births
1934 deaths
19th-century English architects
20th-century English architects
Arts and Crafts architects
Architects from Lincolnshire